The following lists events that happened during 2008 in Republic of Albania.

Incumbents 
 President: Bamir Topi
 Prime Minister: Sali Berisha
 Deputy Prime Minister: Ilir Rusmali

Events

March

 15 March - An explosion in a badly-maintained arms depot causes 16 deaths and over 300 injured, damaging Tirana airport. Defense minister Fatmir Mediu resigns.

June

 12 June - Opposition Socialist Party leaves the Parliament, accusing the ruling Democratic Party of postponing voting on five new members of the Supreme Court awaiting appointment by President Bamir Topi.

Deaths 
 25 October - Bashkim Gazidede, Albanian mathematician, author, politician and a chief of the national intelligence agency
 23 May - Dritan Hoxha, Albanian businessman, founder of Top Media
 26 March - Hekuran Isai, Albanian politician of the Albanian Party of Labour

See also
 2008 in Albanian television

References

External links

 
Years of the 21st century in Albania
2000s in Albania